Odyssey House Texas, located in Houston, Texas is a private not-for-profit organization established in 1989 to provide treatment and education to youth and families whose lives have been devastated by drugs, alcohol, and abuse. At that time, local families who had lost their children to drugs, alcohol and death identified the need for an effective and affordable program.

History
Odyssey House Texas is one of many Odyssey House Therapeutic Communities around the world. The first Odyssey House, in East Harlem, was established by Dr. Judianne Densen-Gerber, a resident psychiatrist working at Metropolitan Hospital in New York City who, dissatisfied with the practice of using drug replacement medications such as methadone as the primary therapeutic intervention, started a "drug free" programme in 1966.

Odyssey House Texas got its start thanks to Spindletop Charities, Inc. a non-profit corporation supported by the gas and oil industry with a mission of helping youth in need, that happened to receive a gift of property in the 1980s. After research by then-president Orville Gaither and his wife Margaret, the two organizations came together, and in 1988 the property was conveyed to Odyssey House. Doors opened to residents in 1989. Spindletop continues to make contributions to Odyssey House.

In July 2010, Cenikor Foundation formed a strategic partnership with Odyssey House Texas. Under the new business agreement, each organization will continue to exclusively serve those same populations, while Cenikor will handle all administrative services and provide financial support for Odyssey House.

Odyssey Houses in other places
Odyssey House Therapeutic Communities are found across the States, as well as Australia (NSW-1977, Victoria-1979) and New Zealand (Auckland-1980, Christchurch-1985). Though they bear the Odyssey House name, the treatment centers have operated as independent entities since the 1980s.

References

1989 establishments in Texas
Therapeutic community
Organizations based in Houston
Organizations established in 1989